Kleinbrook is an unincorporated community in northwest Harris County, Texas, United States.

It is located near Beltway 8 and Bammel North Houston Drive, it is east of the Willowbrook area of Houston, and south of the unincorporated area of Champion Forest. The main road of the subdivision is Bammel North Houston Drive.

Mint Homes builds houses in Kleinbrook, including Section 5. Fourteen developers, including Genstar, Ryland, and U.S. Home, built houses in Kleinbrook.

In 2001 Anita St. Julien, a Kleinbrook resident and an employee of Re/Max Suburban Northwest, said "Though it's a tract neighborhood, it doesn't look very `tracty' because of the numerous builders that we've had over the years." During that year Annie Chen, a broker at Lyn Realty, said "Every street you drive through is clean. It's landscaped, and the houses are painted." Chen said that the homeowners' association rules and enforcement maintain the neighborhood. In 2001 the homeowners' association charged 25 U.S. dollars for a second violation. During that year the neighborhood had $340 annual dues. The neighborhood has a pool, tennis courts, and a clubhouse.

History
In 2001 most of the houses in Kleinbrook were built in the 1980s before the economy collapsed. Many Kleinbrook lots were empty until building resumed in the early 1990s.

Around 2002 Kleinbrook had a median price range of $84,000-121,000 U.S. dollars. In 2004 Kleinbrook, which had 628 houses, had 10 foreclosures. 1.6% of the houses were foreclosed. Its 2005 the subdivision had a median price range of $95,000-$151,000. The 2005 price per square foot was $65.43 while its 2006 median price per square foot was $63.16.

Government and infrastructure
Klein is within Harris County Precinct 4. As of 2010 Jack Cagle heads the precinct.

The community is served by the Harris County Sheriff's Office District I Patrol, headquartered from the Cypresswood Substation at 6831 Cypresswood Drive. The area is served by the Northwest Volunteer Fire Department.

Education
Students living in Kleinbrook are zoned to the Klein Independent School District. The zoned schools are Klenk Elementary School, Wunderlich Intermediate School, and Klein Forest High School. The zoning to the Klein Independent School District schools attracted residents to Kleinbrook. In January 2004 the Klein ISD board of trustees considered rezoning Kleinbrook to McDougle Elementary School in Proposal 2; at that time Kleinbrook had 230 students.

See also

References

Unincorporated communities in Harris County, Texas
Unincorporated communities in Texas